Laren is a village in the Dutch province of Gelderland. It is located in the municipality of Lochem.

Laren was a separate municipality until 1971, when it was merged with Lochem.

History 
It was first mentioned between 1294 and 1295 as Lare, and means pasture in forest. Laren developed into a village in the 19th century along the road from Lochem to Deventer. In 1835, the Dutch Reformed Church was completed. In 1840, it was home to 612 people.

Huis Verwolde is a former havezate. It was first mentioned in 1346. In 1510, it was destroyed by the Prince-Bishop of Utrecht, and was torn down. In 1776, it was replaced by the current building. In 1927, a tower was added to the estate. In 1976, it was sold. It has been opened for visitors, and there are holiday homes near the estate.

People
 Gijs Verdick (1994-2016), professional cyclist

Gallery

References

Populated places in Gelderland
Former municipalities of Gelderland
Lochem